{{DISPLAYTITLE:C5H6N2O4}}
The molecular formula C5H6N2O4 (molar mass: 158.11 g/mol, exact mass: 158.0328 u) may refer to:

 4,5-Dihydroorotic acid
 Ibotenic acid, or ibotenate
 Muscazone